Kristaps Porziņģis (born 2 August 1995) is a Latvian professional basketball player for the Washington Wizards of the National Basketball Association (NBA).

Born in Liepāja, Porziņģis began his professional career with Sevilla in 2012. Porziņģis quickly rose through the team's youth ranks and became the figurehead of the senior team by 2013. He subsequently won the EuroCup Basketball Rising Star award in 2015, where, at age 19, he became the youngest ever recipient of the award. The following summer, he declared for the NBA draft, where he was selected fourth overall by the New York Knicks.

In New York, Porziņģis was seen as one of the Knicks' potential cornerstones, and he was selected as an All-Star in 2018. However, disagreements with the front office led him to be traded to the Dallas Mavericks in 2019. In Dallas, Porziņģis was plagued by injuries and inconsistent play during his tenure, and he was traded to the Washington Wizards in 2022.

Early career
Porziņģis followed his parents' footsteps and started to play basketball at age six. Once he turned 12, his older brother, Jānis, who played professionally in Europe, would take him to offseason training sessions. He played in youth competition with BK Liepājas Lauvas, the most famous club based in hometown of Liepāja, until he was 15 years old. An agent from Latvia sent video of him around this time to teams in Spain and Italy. In 2010, Baloncesto Sevilla, a club that had a professional team competing in the Liga ACB in Spain, called Porziņģis for a tryout in an attempt to recruit foreign talent to its junior squads. Porziņģis recalled the moment and said, "I came here with my brother for two or three days, but it was really hot and I couldn't play at my best because of that. Still, I received a contract in summer 2010 and I signed it." Inmaculada Avivar, a nutritionist for Sevilla, diagnosed that Porziņģis was suffering from anemia, meaning that he had fewer red blood cells. This caused him to feel fatigue, shortness of breath, and inability to exercise. Nevertheless, he gradually overcame the condition and began seeing improvement in his game. In addition to his medical problems, Porziņģis had trouble picking up the language in Seville, making him reluctant to return there after his first tryout. In his first season playing for the junior squad, he struggled to communicate with the coaching staff and his teammates and was often sleepy due to his health.

Porziņģis debuted for the youth squad on 4 January 2012, against its counterpart from Barcelona, adding 12 points and 10 rebounds. The opposing side was led by Alexander Zhigulin, who would go on to enter the 2015 NBA draft and withdraw. However, Sevilla was defeated, 56–75. This game was part of the Ciutat de L'Hospitalet tournament, which led up to the Nike International Junior Tournament (NIJT). On 5 January, he scored a personal best of 16 points on the Spars Sarajevo youth squad, helping Sevilla beat their opponents by a margin of eight points. Porziņģis said, "I knew it was a prestigious tournament and that I had to do well. I think I could have done much better, but I wasn't physically 100 percent. I have seen videos and could have been much more aggressive. But I wish I could have played better." He finished the tournament averaging 9.2 points, 4.8 rebounds and 2.6 blocks. Porziņģis represented the Sevilla junior team again at the same tournament in early 2013. Against Union Olimpija on 4 January, he recorded 15 points and six rebounds. On 6 January, in the team's tournament finale vs Real Madrid's youth squad, he scored 24 points and grabbed 11 rebounds. He also made a total of five three-pointers. Porziņģis proved to be more effective in his second year, averaging 16.6 points, 8.4 rebounds and 2.6 blocks and shooting .481 on three-pointers. This would be his final stint in the youth categories of Sevilla.

Professional career

Sevilla (2012–2015)

2012–13: Rookie season
Entering the 2012–13 ACB season, Sevilla had hired Aíto García Reneses, who previously worked with the likes of Pau Gasol, Juan Carlos Navarro, Ricky Rubio and Rudy Fernández. On 29 September 2012, Porziņģis got the opportunity to make an appearance with the club's first team, but was allowed to play just a minute. Sevilla took a tremendous loss to CB Murcia. Following a return to the youth categories of the club at the Torneig de Bàsquet Junior Ciutat de L'Hospitalet, he went back to competing for the senior squad. On 16 January 2013, he logged only four minutes against Spartak Saint Petersburg in the EuroCup, scoring no points, but contributing one rebound and one assist. He scored his first basket for the senior team on 20 February 2013, in a rematch with Spartak. Porziņģis said, "I was very nervous at the beginning: I wanted to do well and not pick up turnovers. At the same time, I got a lot of confidence with players of my same age. That allowed me to play better with the first team and practice with more confidence." On 4 May 2013, he posted a season-high seven points with the senior team, hitting two of three shots vs Bilbao Basket in ACB competition.

2013–14: Second season and NBA consideration
Porziņģis opened his second season on Sevilla's main squad strong in his third game against the EuroLeague team Laboral Kutxa, leading them to a 20-point ACB victory on 2 November 2013. He notched 12 points, six rebounds, and four blocks. He broke his scoring record once more against Real Madrid on 30 November 2013, nearly leading his team to a victory. Against the very same team on 6 April 2014, Porziņģis scored a career-high 20 points, nailing two three-pointers. Despite his team losing, he began to trend on social media because of his performance. He said, "It was a very good game for me on offense. I didn't get any rebounds in that game. I had a good shooting night, but could have helped more on defense. Still, fans in Madrid gave me a nice ovation when I fouled out and I liked that a lot." On 25 May, he got the chance to face his idol Justin Doellman of Barcelona, whom he called the "best power forward in Spanish basketball". He scored 14 points against Doellman's team. In May 2014, Porziņģis was selected in the ACB All-Young Players Team of the 2013–14 season.

In April, Porziņģis declared himself eligible for the 2014 NBA draft. Before and after he made the decision, he drew interest from National Basketball Association (NBA) teams such as the Orlando Magic, who held the 12th overall pick, and traveled to Europe to scout him. The Oklahoma City Thunder reportedly were certainly going to select him with the 21st pick in the case that he remained. Porziņģis was considered an unfinished product and a top-15 draft pick. According to DraftExpress.com, he was the fourth-youngest prospect in their top-100 rankings. Shortly before the day of the draft, however, he withdrew his name. Porziņģis's agent Andy Miller released the information to ESPN, saying that his client did not feel prepared to become a part of the NBA and wanted to develop his skills until the 2015 draft. One of the league's general managers commented on him, "He's very talented. He wasn't ready, but we would've seriously considered drafting him anyway. If he continues to develop his game, get more minutes and his body develops, I think he could be a top-five pick in 2015. He has that kind of talent."

2014–15: EuroCup Rising Star
Prior to the 2014–15 ACB season, head coach Aíto García Reneses parted ways with Sevilla. On 4 October 2014, against CB 1939 Canarias, Porziņģis made his season debut in the Liga ACB, scoring three points in the game. He made his first appearance at the 2014–15 EuroCup on 15 October, vs. EWE Baskets Oldenburg and scored 2 points. However, he had a strong EuroCup performance against Pallacanestro Virtus Roma in the weeks that followed, in which he contributed 18 points, seven rebounds, four assists, four steals and two blocks. He recorded a double-double in mid-November in a win over Estudiantes, adding 11 points and 11 rebounds. On 11 February 2015, he scored a season-high 19 points against the EuroCup's Turów Zgorzelec. He tied this record on 18 April 2015, vs. Bàsquet Manresa in the ACB. On 15 April 2015, Porziņģis was named the winner of the EuroCup Rising Star Award of the season. One month later, he repeated in the ACB All-Young Players Team, after avoiding the relegation with Baloncesto Sevilla.

New York Knicks (2015–2019)

On 16 April 2015, Porziņģis entered the 2015 NBA draft, according to a report from agent Andy Miller. After gaining a season more of experience, he became known as a lottery pick and a potential top-five selection. He drew interest from teams such as the Los Angeles Lakers, who had the No. 2 pick and had several personnel that had seen Porziņģis play in Spain. He was compared with players such as Pau Gasol and Dirk Nowitzki, but also Darko Miličić, a former lottery selection widely considered a draft bust. Adrian Wojnarowski of Yahoo! Sports wrote, "Porziņģis has an innate awareness about the way the American public sees a young, long European teenager. He comes to the NBA with the full understanding that popular basketball culture declares him guilty until proven innocent of the basketball crimes of Darko Miličić and Nikoloz Tskitishvili and Andrea Bargnani. He's considered a stiff, a bust, a blown lottery pick until he doesn't become one..."

On 25 June 2015, Porziņģis was selected with the fourth overall pick in the 2015 NBA draft by the New York Knicks. He was booed by some New York fans upon being drafted, but vowed to change the fans' opinions on him from negative to positive. On the same night, the New York Knicks traded for Porziņģis' teammate from Sevilla, Willy Hernangómez, who was originally drafted by the Philadelphia 76ers as a 35th overall pick. Porziņģis became the highest drafted Latvian and Baltic player in NBA history.

2015–16: Rookie season

On 30 July 2015, Porziņģis signed his rookie-scale contract with the Knicks. On 28 October 2015, he scored 16 points in his NBA debut, leading New York to a 122–97 season-opening win over the Milwaukee Bucks. He was 3 of 11 from the field and 9 of 12 from the line. On 21 November 2015, he had 24 points, 14 rebounds and seven blocked shots to lead the Knicks to a 107–102 victory over the Houston Rockets, becoming the first 20-year-old to post such a stat line in a single game since Shaquille O'Neal in 1992–93.

He became the first rookie to reach those totals since Tim Duncan in 1998. On 3 December 2015, he was named Eastern Conference Rookie of the Month for games played in October and November. He ranked third among all rookies in scoring (13.7 ppg) and was second in rebounding (9.3 rpg) and blocked shots (1.89 bpg) for October and November. He went on to claim Eastern Conference Rookie of the Month honours for December and January as well. On 12 February 2016, he scored 30 points for Team World in the Rising Stars Challenge. On 23 March 2016, he tied a then career high with 29 points and grabbed 10 rebounds in a 115–107 win over the Chicago Bulls. He was one point short of becoming the first rookie since Patrick Ewing to put up 30 points and 10 rebounds in one game for the Knicks.

Porziņģis appeared in 72 of the Knicks' 82 games in 2015–16, missing the final seven games of the season due to a right shoulder strain. He finished with averages of 14.3 points, 7.3 rebounds, 1.3 assists and 1.9 blocks per game. Porziņģis finished second in the NBA Rookie of the Year Award voting behind winner Karl-Anthony Towns, and earned NBA All-Rookie First Team honors.

2016–18: Promising years
On 16 November 2016, Porziņģis scored a then career-high 35 points in a 105–102 win over the Detroit Pistons. On 11 December 2016, he recorded 26 points, 12 rebounds and a career high-tying seven blocks in a 118–112 win over the Los Angeles Lakers. On 19 January 2017, he came off the bench for the first time in his NBA career after returning from a four-game absence due to a sore left Achilles tendon. He subsequently scored 15 points in a 113–110 loss to the Washington Wizards. During the 2017 All-Star Weekend, Porziņģis played for Team World in the Rising Stars Challenge and won the Skills Challenge.

In the Knicks' season opener the following season, on 19 October 2017, Porziņģis had 31 points and 12 rebounds in a 105–84 loss to the Oklahoma City Thunder. On 30 October 2017, he scored a then career-high 38 points in a 116–110 win over the Denver Nuggets. Less than a week later, on 5 November, Porziņģis set a then career high with 40 points in a 108–101 win over the Indiana Pacers. Porziņģis was subsequently named Eastern Conference Player of the Week for games played from Monday, 30 October through Sunday, 5 November. Porziņģis would record the best start to a season for Knicks player, earning 300 points through 10 games, two more than Bernard King had to open the 1984–85 season, and his performances continued, where, on 23 January 2018, he was named an Eastern Conference All-Star reserve.

However, on 6 February 2018, in a 103–89 loss to the Milwaukee Bucks, Porziņģis tore his left ACL. He was subsequently ruled out for the rest of the season.

2018–19: Injury and recovery
In October 2018, the Knicks decided against signing Porziņģis to a rookie extension, a move that would give New York an extra $10 million in cap space in the summer of 2019 while making Porziņģis a restricted free agent in the offseason. Due to recovering from his ACL injury, Porziņģis did not play for the Knicks to begin the 2018–19 season.

Dallas Mavericks (2019–2022)
On 31 January 2019, after a meeting with the Knicks left franchise officials with the impression that he wanted to be traded, Porziņģis was traded alongside Trey Burke, Courtney Lee and Tim Hardaway Jr. to the Dallas Mavericks in exchange for DeAndre Jordan, Wesley Matthews, Dennis Smith Jr., an unprotected 2021 first-round draft pick, and an additional top-ten protected 2023 first round draft pick. He sat out the remainder of the 2018–19 season, healing from his ACL injury. On 12 July, Porziņģis agreed to re-sign with the Mavericks on a five-year maximum contract worth $158 million.

2019–20: Playoff debut
Porziņģis debuted for the Mavericks on 23 October 2019, posting 23 points and 4 rebounds in a 108–100 win over the Washington Wizards. On 31 January 2020, he scored a then season-high 35 points, along with 12 rebounds in a 128–121 loss to the Houston Rockets. On 3 February, that season-high would be surpassed with a 38-point, 12-rebound performance in a 112–103 win over the Indiana Pacers. Just two days later, Porziņģis would follow that up with 32 points and 12 rebounds in a 121–107 loss to the Memphis Grizzlies, before leaving the game with a broken nose. On 1 March, Porziņģis matched his then season-high 38 points, along with 14 rebounds and 5 blocks, in a 111–91 victory over the Minnesota Timberwolves. Three days later, he registered 34 points, 12 rebounds and 5 blocks in a 127–123 overtime win over the New Orleans Pelicans, becoming the first player since Shaquille O'Neal in 2000 to have consecutive 30-point, 5-block games. On 2 March 2020, Porziņģis was named the Western Conference player of the week, his second time to earn player of the week honors. From 25 February to 1 March Porziņģis  averaged 26.3 points per game, 11.8 rebounds per game and 2.3 blocks per game. The Mavericks won three games and lost once. On 31 July, Porziņģis recorded a season-high 39 points, as well as 16 rebounds, in a 153–149 overtime loss to the Houston Rockets. This was the Mavericks’ first game in the Orlando bubble, returning from a four-month hiatus due to the COVID-19 pandemic. Porziņģis finished his bubble play strong, averaging 30.5 points, 9.5 rebounds, 2.2 assists and 1.5 blocks per game across six games, earning him All Seeding Games Second Team honors. .

On 17 August, Porziņģis made his NBA playoff debut in a 118–110 loss in Game 1 to the Los Angeles Clippers, recording 14 points and six rebounds before being ejected early in the third quarter following an altercation with Marcus Morris. Two days later in Game 2, Porziņģis would help the Mavericks even up the series with a 23-point and 7-rebound performance in a 127–114 victory before posting 34 points and 13 rebounds in a 130–122 loss in Game 3. However, Porziņģis would miss the remainder of the series with a lateral meniscus tear and Dallas would be eliminated in six games.

2020–21: Playoff fallout

Porziņģis had surgery on his torn lateral meniscus on 9 October 2020. Porziņģis would go on to miss the first 9 games of the 2020-21 NBA season recovering from surgery before making his season debut on 13 January 2021, against the Charlotte Hornets. Porziņģis scored 16 points in his season debut and was held to a 21-minute restriction. As a precautionary measure, Porziņģis would not play in the majority of back to back games during the regular season. On 12 February 2021, Porziņģis  would score a season high 36 points with a career high eight made three pointers in a 143–130 victory over the New Orleans Pelicans. On 26 March 2021, Porziņģis would tie a career high by grabbing 18 rebounds in a 109–94 loss to the Indiana Pacers. Dallas improved on their previous season record and finished the season 42–30. The Mavericks clinched the Southwest division for the first time since the 2009–10 season following a 110–90 victory over the Cleveland Cavaliers on 7 May 2021. Porziņģis finished the season averaging 20.1 points per game and 8.9 rebounds per game. The 2020–21 season proved to be Porziņģis' most efficient season of his career thus far, posting career highs in eFG%, TS% and FG% statistics. Porziņģis became just the sixth player in Dallas Mavericks franchise history to have multiple seasons averaging over 20 points per game, joining Mark Aguirre, Rolando Blackman, Luka Dončić, Michael Finley and Dirk Nowitzki.

However, Porziņģis' numbers dropped drastically during the first round of the playoffs, averaging 13.1 points per game and grabbing 5.4 rebounds per game. The Mavericks would go onto lose in the first round to the Los Angeles Clippers for the second consecutive season in seven games. Following the series, Porziņģis would get roundly mocked for his subpar performance during the series with many fans calling him "Pandemic P", a name originally used for mocking Paul George for his abysmal performance during the 2020 playoffs. Porziņģis was disgruntled with his role in the first round series against the Clippers, often being relegated to a decoy or three-point spacing threat. Rumors of him wanting a trade in the offseason began to form, but nothing came of it. Porziņģis began training for the upcoming season. In an Instagram post, Porziņģis vowed to come back stronger and more refined and that the Unicorn 2.0 was incoming.

2021–22 season: Final season in Dallas
Following the 2021 playoffs, the Mavericks parted ways with long time head coach Rick Carlisle who resigned from his position as head coach after 13 seasons. Jason Kidd was hired as the team's new head coach, marking Porziņģis' sixth head coach in seven NBA seasons. The 2021 offseason was the first offseason that Porziņģis was not recovering from injury since entering the league in 2015.

Porziņģis scored 11 points, grabbed five rebounds and recorded two blocks in the Mavericks season opening 113-87 loss to the Atlanta Hawks. Porziņģis played three games before missing a string of games with lower back tightness. He returned to action 6 November 2021, against the Boston Celtics. He scored 21 points and grabbed seven rebounds. Porziņģis scored 10 of his points in the fourth quarter, including a putback dunk to tie the game at 104. Porziņģis scored a then season-high 32 points in a 123–109 victory over the San Antonio Spurs on 12 November 2021. Porziņģis then had another then season-high 34 points in a 132-117 victory over the Portland Trail Blazers on 27 December 2021. During a 104-91 victory against the Memphis Grizzlies on 23 January 2022, Porziņģis recorded a season-high six blocks. On 29 January 2022, Porziņģis would play in what would be his last game as a Maverick against the Indiana Pacers; Porziņģis left during the middle of the game due to a knee bruise.

Washington Wizards (2022–present)
On 10 February 2022, the Mavericks traded Porziņģis and a protected 2022 second-round pick to the Washington Wizards in exchange for Spencer Dinwiddie and Dāvis Bertāns.  Porziņģis would play his first game as a Wizard on 6 March 2022, dropping 25 points against the Pacers. On 19 March 2022, Porziņģis led the Wizards to a 127–119 comeback victory over the Los Angeles Lakers, which featured Porziņģis posterizing LeBron James for a dunk during crunch time. On 30 March 2022, Porziņģis dropped a season-high 35 points in a 127–110 victory over the Orlando Magic. Porziņģis then recorded 24 points against the Mavericks, his former team, in a 135–103 victory. The Wizards would ultimately fail to make both the playoffs and the play-in tournament, finishing with a 35–47 record.

The following season, on 12 November 2022, Porziņģis recorded a double-double with 31 points and 10 rebounds in a 121–112 win over the Utah Jazz. On 28 November, Porzingis scored a then career-high 41 points in a 142–127 win over the Minnesota Timberwolves. The next game, Porziņģis recorded 27 points and a career-high 19 rebounds in an 113–107 loss to the Brooklyn Nets. On January 2, 2023, Porziņģis was named the NBA Eastern Conference Player of the Week for Week 11 (December 26 – January 1), his third career NBA Player of the Week award and first with the Wizards. He helped lead the Wizards to an undefeated 4–0 week with averages of 24.5 points, 8.5 rebounds and 2.5 blocks. On 8 March 2023, Porziņģis scored a career-high 43 points on 17-of-22 shooting from the field and 7-of-10 shooting from three-point range along with five rebounds and five assists in a 122–120 loss to the Atlanta Hawks.

National team career

Junior national team
Porziņģis played with the Latvian youth team and was selected in the 2013 FIBA Europe Under-18 Championship All-Tournament Team.

Senior national team
In 2017, Porziņģis played for Latvia at EuroBasket 2017, where he averaged 23.6 points per game (ranked third), 5.9 rebounds per game (ranked 19th) and 1.9 blocks per game (ranked first). Latvia was eliminated in the quarterfinals by eventual champions Slovenia, losing 97–103. Against Slovenia, Porziņģis  scored a tournament-high 34 points despite playing in foul trouble throughout the game. Porziņģis  scored 16 of his 34 points in the final period to help Latvia cut Slovenia's 13-point lead to two with two minutes remaining.

After a 5 year absence, in August 2022, he returned to play for the national team in the August window of the second round of the FIBA Basketball World Cup 2023 European Qualifiers. In 2 games Porziņģis averaged 25.5 points per game, 14 rebounds per game and 3 blocks per game. In a 111-85 victory over Turkey, Porziņģis scored 22 points, grabbed 14 rebounds and blocked 6 shots in just 22 minutes of playing. In Latvia's 87-80 victory over Great Britain, Porziņģis grabbed 14 rebounds and scored 29 points on 75% shooting.

Player profile

Porziņģis has been compared to Dirk Nowitzki, with the pair having both been groomed in Europe before entering the NBA. Both Porziņģis and Nowitzki are seven-foot-plus players who are comfortable anywhere on the front line and can both shoot from the outside. During his rookie season, Kevin Durant dubbed Porziņģis a basketball "unicorn" because of his rare combination of talents. In January 2018, Porziņģis was averaging 19 shot attempts per game for the Knicks, the most ever by a player his size (the only players  or taller to average 15 field goal attempts per game were Ralph Sampson and Yao Ming). Due to his height and mobility, Porziņģis is able to shoot over most defenders, with his sheer size and high volume creating a unique advantage shared by no other player in the league.

Career statistics

NBA

Regular season

|-
| style="text-align:left;"| 
| style="text-align:left;"| New York
| 72 || 72 || 28.4 || .421 || .333 || .838 || 7.3 || 1.3 || .7 || 1.9 || 14.3
|-
| style="text-align:left;"| 
| style="text-align:left;"| New York
| 66 || 65 || 32.8 || .450 || .357 || .786 || 7.2 || 1.5 || .7 || 2.0 || 18.1
|-
| style="text-align:left;"| 
| style="text-align:left;"| New York
| 48 || 48 || 32.4 || .439 || .395 || .793 || 6.6 || 1.2 || .8 || 2.4 || 22.7
|-
| style="text-align:left;"| 
| style="text-align:left;"| Dallas
| 57 || 57 || 31.8 || .427 || .352 || .799 || 9.5 || 1.8 || .7 || 2.0 || 20.4
|-
| style="text-align:left;"| 
| style="text-align:left;"| Dallas
| 43 || 43 || 30.9 || .476 || .376 || .855 || 8.9 || 1.6 || .5 || 1.3 || 20.1
|-
| style="text-align:left;"| 
| style="text-align:left;"| Dallas
| 34 || 34 || 29.5 || .451 || .283 || .865 || 7.7 || 2.0 || .7 || 1.7 || 19.2
|-
| style="text-align:left;"| 
| style="text-align:left;"| Washington
| 17 || 17 || 28.2 || .475 || .367 || .871 || 8.8 || 2.9 || .7 || 1.5 || 22.1
|-
| style="text-align:center;" colspan="2"| Career
| 337 || 336 || 30.8 || .444 || .353 || .820 || 7.9 || 1.6 || .7 || 1.9 || 18.9

Playoffs

|-
| style="text-align:left;"| 2020
| style="text-align:left;"| Dallas
| 3 || 3 || 31.3 || .525 || .529 || .870 || 8.7 || .7 || .0 || 1.0 || 23.7
|-
| style="text-align:left;"| 2021
| style="text-align:left;"| Dallas
| 7 || 7 || 33.3 || .472 || .296 || .842 || 5.4 || 1.3 || 1.3 || .7 || 13.1
|- class="sortbottom"
| style="text-align:center;" colspan="2"| Career
| 10 || 10 || 32.7 || .491 || .386 || .857 || 6.4 || 1.1 || .9 || .8 || 16.3

Europe

Liga ACB

|-
| style="text-align:left;"| 2012–13
| style="text-align:left;"| Cajasol Sevilla
| 7 || 0 || 14.9 || .500 || .500 || .667 || .7 || .0|| .3 || .1 || 2.6
|-
| style="text-align:left;"| 2013–14
| style="text-align:left;"| Cajasol Sevilla
| 32 || 32 || 14.9 || .476 || .333 || .607 || 2.8 || .3 || .6 || .9 || 6.7
|-
| style="text-align:left;"| 2014–15
| style="text-align:left;"| Baloncesto Sevilla
| 34 || 34 || 21.7 || .471 || .313 || .774 || 4.8 || .4 || .9 || 1.0 || 10.7
|- class="sortbottom"
| style="text-align:center;" colspan="2"| Career
| 73 || 67 || 17.3 || .474 || .326 || .730 || 3.5 || .3 || .7|| .9 || 8.2

Personal life

Porziņģis was born to parents who had experience playing the game of basketball. Tālis, his father, competed semi-professionally before becoming a bus driver. His mother, Ingrīda, was previously on Latvia women's youth national basketball team. His older brother, Jānis, also played professionally, while Mārtiņš, who is approximately 15 years older than his youngest sibling, was also an avid player. In a 2017 E:60 documentary on Porziņģis' life, his parents revealed that they had another son, Toms, who was born four years before Kristaps and died at 14 months. Through an interpreter, Ingrīda said about Toms' death, "It felt like a bulldozer had run over my life. We had two other children who we had to care for. We had to live on. After Kristaps was born, it was like he had to live for two lives."

Jānis Porziņģis competed at the European second tier EuroCup level, the same level in Europe that Kristaps later played at, in one game, and played European professional club basketball in various national leagues, including the Italian League, for more than 10 years. He is known to mentor his younger brother on and off the court and often called him after playing games for Cajasol Sevilla in Spain. Porziņģis talked about the relationship in an interview, "We'd break down the details. We watched the film together. He's always pushing me to work hard. We just spend a lot of time together and we just talk about basketball all the time..." The elder Porziņģis helped him train in the summer and work out in the gym in preparation for international competition in 2012.

Following two seasons in Spain and almost two years living in Seville, Porziņģis was able to speak Spanish far more fluently. Porziņģis is thus fluent in three different languages, including English. An NBA executive said, "He speaks great English and I don't see it being that difficult of a transition off the court." In October 2016, Porziņģis signed a shoe deal with Adidas, the most lucrative deal for a European player. He made the switch to Adidas after partnering with Nike for his rookie season.

Porziņģis is a football fan and supports his hometown team FK Liepāja, as well as Real Madrid and former club Sevilla. He is also an avid fan of Counter-Strike: Global Offensive, which he plays regularly.

In 2015, Porziņģis was named the Latvian Rising Star of the Year.

Rape allegation and possible extortion
In March 2019, it was publicly revealed that a woman accused Porziņģis of raping her at the Sky building in February 2018, hours after he tore his ACL. The woman reportedly told police she waited more than a year to come forward because she had discussed getting a $68,000 payout from Porziņģis to keep quiet. Porziņģis' attorney, Roland G. Riopelle, publicly denied the claim, and said he had previously referred the case to federal authorities due to the "accuser's extortionate demands".

See also

List of tallest players in National Basketball Association history

References

External links

Kristaps Porziņģis at acb.com

1995 births
Living people
Centers (basketball)
Dallas Mavericks players
Latvian expatriate basketball people in Spain
Latvian expatriate basketball people in the United States
Latvian men's basketball players
Liga ACB players
National Basketball Association All-Stars
National Basketball Association players from Latvia
New York Knicks draft picks
New York Knicks players
Power forwards (basketball)
Real Betis Baloncesto players
Sportspeople from Liepāja
Washington Wizards players